Fraser Matthew Horsfall (born 12 November 1996) is an English professional footballer who plays for Stockport County, as a defender.

Career
Born in Huddersfield, Horsfall began his senior career at Huddersfield Town, having graduated through the academy at the club after joining in 2004. Horsfall was subsequently sent out on loan to Trafford, Stalybridge Celtic, Salford City and Gateshead, before signing on loan for Kidderminster Harriers. In December 2017, after 16 National League North appearances, Horsfall joined Kidderminster on a permanent deal. During his time at Kidderminster, Horsfall was called up to the England C squad twice. In July 2019, Horsfall signed for Football League club Macclesfield Town. He signed for Northampton Town in August 2020.

In June 2022 it was announced that he would sign for Stockport County on a free transfer on 1 July 2022.

Personal life
During his youth footballing career, Horsfall played youth cricket in his hometown of Halifax for Sowerby Bridge Church Institute.

Career statistics

Honours
Individual

 PFA Team of the Year: League Two 2021–22

References

1996 births
Living people
English footballers
Footballers from Huddersfield
Huddersfield Town A.F.C. players
Trafford F.C. players
Stalybridge Celtic F.C. players
Salford City F.C. players
Gateshead F.C. players
Kidderminster Harriers F.C. players
Macclesfield Town F.C. players
Northampton Town F.C. players
Stockport County F.C. players
Association football defenders
English Football League players
National League (English football) players
England semi-pro international footballers